Raging Bull is a 1980 American biographical sports  drama film directed by Martin Scorsese, produced by Robert Chartoff and Irwin Winkler and adapted by Paul Schrader and Mardik Martin from Jake LaMotta's 1970 memoir Raging Bull: My Story. The film, distributed by United Artists, stars Robert De Niro as Jake LaMotta, an Italian-American middleweight boxer whose self-destructive and obsessive rage, jealousy and animalistic appetite destroyed his relationship with his wife and family. Also featured in the film are Joe Pesci as LaMotta's brother Joey and Cathy Moriarty in her film debut as LaMotta's wife Vikki. Nicholas Colasanto, Theresa Saldana and Frank Vincent play supporting roles in the film, and John Turturro makes his film debut in an uncredited role.

Scorsese was initially reluctant to develop the project, though he eventually came to relate to LaMotta's story. Schrader re-wrote Martin's first screenplay, and Scorsese and De Niro together made uncredited contributions thereafter. Pesci was an unknown actor prior to the film, as was Moriarty, whom Pesci suggested for her role. Scorsese was exacting in the process of editing and mixing the film, expecting it to be his last major feature.

Raging Bull premiered in New York on November 14, 1980 and was released in theaters on December 19, 1980. The film had a lukewarm box office of $23.4 million against its $18 million budget. The film received mixed reviews upon its release; while De Niro's performance and the editing were widely acclaimed, it garnered criticism due to its violent content. Despite the mixed reviews, the film was nominated for eight Academy Awards at the 53rd Academy Awards (tying with The Elephant Man as the most nominated film of the ceremony), including Best Picture and Best Director, and won two: Best Actor for De Niro (his second Oscar) and Best Editing.

After its release, Raging Bull went on to garner high critical praise, and is now considered one of the greatest films ever made. In 1990, it became the first film to be selected in its first year of eligibility for preservation in the United States National Film Registry by the Library of Congress, as being "culturally, historically or aesthetically significant", and the American Film Institute ranked it as the fourth-greatest American movie of all time.

Plot 

In 1964, an aging, overweight Italian American, Jake LaMotta, practices a comedy routine.

In 1941, LaMotta is in a major boxing match against Jimmy Reeves, where he suffered his first loss. Jake's brother Joey discusses a potential shot for the middleweight title with one of his Mafia connections, Salvy Batts, but he repeatedly refuses the mafia's help. Some time thereafter, Jake spots a fifteen-year-old girl named Vickie at an open-air swimming pool in his Bronx neighborhood. He eventually pursues a relationship with her, although he is already married. In 1943, Jake defeats Sugar Ray Robinson, and has a rematch three weeks later. Despite Jake dominating Robinson during the bout, the judges surprisingly rule in favor of Robinson, whom Joey feels won only because he was enlisting into the Army the following week. By 1945, Jake marries Vickie.

Jake constantly worries about Vickie having feelings for other men, particularly when she nonchalantly comments about Tony Janiro, Jake's opponent in his next fight. His jealousy is evident when he brutally defeats Janiro in front of Tommy Como, the local mob boss, and Vickie. As Joey discusses the victory with journalists at the Copacabana, he is distracted by seeing Vickie approach a table with Salvy and his crew. Joey speaks with Vickie, who says she is giving up on his brother. Blaming Salvy, Joey viciously attacks him in a fight that spills outside of the club. Como later orders them to apologize, and has Joey tell Jake that if he wants a chance at the championship title, which Como controls, he will have to take a dive first. In a match against Billy Fox, after briefly pummeling his opponent, Jake does not even bother to put up a fight. He is suspended shortly thereafter from the board on suspicion of throwing the fight, though he realizes the error of his judgment when it is too late. He is eventually reinstated, and in 1949, wins the middleweight championship title against Marcel Cerdan.

A year later, Jake asks Joey if he fought with Salvy at the Copacabana because of Vickie. Jake then asks if Joey had an affair with her; Joey refuses to answer, insults Jake, and leaves. Jake directly asks Vickie about the affair, and when she hides from him in the bathroom, he breaks down the door, pushing her to sarcastically state that she had sex with the entire neighborhood (including Joey, Salvy and Tommy) out of exhaustion, exclaiming "What do you want me to say!?". Jake, followed by Vickie, angrily walks to Joey's house and assaults him in front of his wife Lenora and their children before knocking Vickie unconscious. After defending his championship belt in a grueling fifteen-round bout against Laurent Dauthuille in 1950, he calls his brother after the fight, but when Joey assumes Salvy is on the other end and starts insulting and cursing at him, Jake silently hangs up. Estranged from Joey, Jake's career begins to decline slowly and he eventually loses his title to Sugar Ray Robinson in their final encounter in 1951.

By 1956, Jake and his family have moved to Miami. After he stays out all night at his new nightclub there, Vickie tells him she wants a divorce (which she has been planning since his retirement) as well as full custody of their kids. She also threatens to call the police if he comes anywhere near them. He is later arrested for introducing under-age girls to men in his club. He unsuccessfully attempts to bribe his way out of his criminal case using the jewels from his championship belt instead of selling the belt itself. In 1957, he goes to jail, sorrowfully questioning his misfortune and crying in despair. Upon returning to New York City in 1958, he encounters Joey, who forgives him but is elusive.

Again in 1964, Jake now recites the "I coulda been a contender" scene from the 1954 film On the Waterfront, where Terry Malloy complains that his brother should have been there for him but is also keen enough to give himself some slack. After a stagehand informs him that the auditorium where he is about to perform is crowded, Jake starts to chant "I'm the boss" while shadowboxing.

Cast

LaMotta's opponents

Production

Development 
Raging Bull came about when De Niro read the autobiography upon which the film is based on the set of The Godfather Part II. Although disappointed by the book's writing style, he became fascinated by the character of Jake LaMotta. He showed the book to Martin Scorsese on the set of Alice Doesn't Live Here Anymore in the hope that he would consider the project. Scorsese repeatedly turned down the opportunity to direct the film, claiming he had no idea what Raging Bull was about, even though he had read some of the text. Never a sports fan, when he found out what LaMotta used to do for a living, he said, "A boxer? I don't like boxing...Even as a kid, I always thought that boxing was boring... It was something I couldn't, wouldn't grasp." His overall opinion of sport in general is, "Anything with a ball, no good." The book was then passed onto Mardik Martin, the film's eventual co-screenwriter, who said "the trouble is the damn thing has been done a hundred times before—a fighter who has trouble with his brother and his wife and the mob is after him". The book was even shown to producers Robert Chartoff and Irwin Winkler by De Niro, who were willing to assist only if Scorsese agreed. After nearly dying from a drug overdose, Scorsese agreed to make the film, not only to save his own life but also to save his career. Scorsese began to relate very personally to the story of Jake LaMotta, and in it he saw how the boxing ring can be "an allegory for whatever you do in life", which for him paralleled moviemaking, "you make movies, you're in the ring each time."

Preparation for the film began with Scorsese shooting some 8 mm color footage featuring De Niro boxing in a ring. One night when the footage was being shown to De Niro, Michael Chapman, and his friend and mentor, the British director Michael Powell, Powell pointed out that the color of the gloves at the time would have only been maroon, oxblood, or even black. Scorsese decided to use this as one of the reasons to film Raging Bull in black and white. Other reasons would be to distinguish the film from other color films around the time and to acknowledge the problem of fading color film stock—an issue Scorsese recognized. Scorsese went to two matches at Madison Square Garden to aid his research, picking up on minor but essential details such as the blood sponge and later, the blood on the ropes (which would later be used in the film). According to the brief comments on the inlay card of the Raging Bull DVD, Scorsese was not—and still is not—a fan of sports or boxing, which he describes as boring. When he saw the blood-soaked sponges being dipped in a bucket, he recalls thinking to himself, 'And they call this sport.'

Screenplay 
Under the guidance of Chartoff and Winkler, Mardik Martin was asked to start writing the screenplay. According to De Niro, under no circumstances would United Artists accept Martin's script. The story was based on the vision of journalist Pete Hamill of a 1930s and 1940s style, when boxing was known as "the great dark prince of sports". De Niro was unimpressed when he finished reading the first draft, however. Taxi Driver screenwriter Paul Schrader was swiftly brought in to rewrite the script around August 1978. Some of the changes that Schrader made to the script included a rewrite of the scene with the undercooked steak and inclusion of LaMotta seen masturbating in a Florida cell. The character of LaMotta's brother, Joey, was finally added, previously absent from Martin's script. United Artists saw a massive improvement on the quality of the script. However, its chief executives, Steven Bach and David Field, met with Scorsese, De Niro, and producer Irwin Winkler in November 1978 to say they were worried that the content would be X-rated material and have no chance of finding an audience.

According to Scorsese, the script was left to him and De Niro, and they spent two-and-a-half weeks on the island of Saint Martin extensively re-building the content of the film. The most significant change would be the entire scene when LaMotta fixes his television and then accuses his wife of having an affair. Other changes included the removal of Jake and Joey's father; the reduction of organized crime's role in the story and a major re-write of LaMotta's fight with Tony Janiro. They were also responsible for the end sequence where LaMotta is all alone in his dressing room quoting the "I could have been a contender" scene from On the Waterfront. An extract of Richard III had been considered but Michael Powell thought it would be a bad decision within the context of an American film. According to Steven Bach, the first two screenwriters (Martin and Schrader) would receive credit, but since there was no payment to the writer's guild on the script, De Niro and Scorsese's work would remain uncredited.

Casting 

One of Scorsese's trademarks was casting many actors and actresses new to the profession. De Niro, who was already committed to play Jake LaMotta, began to help Scorsese track down unfamiliar names to play his on-screen brother, Joey, and wife, Vikki. The role of Joey LaMotta was the first to be cast. De Niro was watching a low budget television film called The Death Collector when he saw the part of a young career criminal played by Joe Pesci (then an unknown and struggling actor) as an ideal candidate. Prior to receiving a call from De Niro and Scorsese for the proposal to star in the film, Pesci had not worked in film for four years and was working at an Italian restaurant in New Jersey.
The role of Vikki (respelled as Vickie in the final film), Jake's second wife, had interest across the board, but it was Pesci who suggested actress Cathy Moriarty from a picture he once saw at a New Jersey disco. Both De Niro and Scorsese believed that Moriarty, then 18, could portray the role after meeting with her on several occasions and noticing her husky voice and physical maturity. The duo had to prove to the Screen Actors Guild that she was right for the role when Cis Corman showed 10 comparing pictures of both Moriarty and the real Vikki LaMotta for proof she had a resemblance. Moriarty was then asked to take a screen test which she managed—partly aided with some improvised lines from De Niro—after some confusion wondering why the crew were filming her take. Joe Pesci also persuaded his former show-biz pal and co-star in The Death Collector, Frank Vincent, to try for the role of Salvy Batts. Following a successful audition and screen test, Vincent received the call to say he had received the part. Charles Scorsese, the director's father, made his film debut as Tommy Como's cousin, Charlie.

While in the midst of practicing a Bronx accent and preparing for his role, De Niro met both LaMotta and his ex-wife, Vikki, on separate occasions. Vikki, who lived in Florida, told stories about her life with her former husband and also showed old home movies (that later inspired a similar sequence to be done for the film). Jake LaMotta, on the other hand, served as his trainer, accompanied by Al Silvani as coach at the Gramercy club in New York, getting him into shape. The actor found that boxing came naturally to him; he entered as a middleweight boxer, winning two of his three fights in a Brooklyn ring dubbed "young LaMotta" by the commentator. According to Jake LaMotta, De Niro was one of the top 20 best middleweight boxers of all time.

Principal photography 

According to the production mixer, Michael Evje, the film began shooting at the Los Angeles Olympic Auditorium on April 16, 1979. Grips hung huge curtains of black duvetyne on all four sides of the ring area to contain the artificial smoke used extensively for visual effect. On May 7, the production moved to the Culver City  Studio, Stage 3, and filmed there until the middle of June. Scorsese made it clear during filming that he did not appreciate the traditional way in films of showing fights from the spectators' view. He insisted that one camera operated by the Director of Photography, Michael Chapman, would be placed inside the ring as he would play the role of an opponent keeping out of the way of other fighters so that viewers could see the emotions of the fighters, including those of Jake. The precise moves of the boxers were to be done as dance routines from the information of a book about dance instructors in the mode of Arthur Murray. A punching bag in the middle of the ring was used by De Niro between takes before he aggressively came straight on to do the next scene. The initial five-week schedule for the shooting of the boxing scenes took longer than expected, putting Scorsese under pressure.

According to Scorsese, production of the film was then closed down for around four months with the entire crew being paid, so De Niro could go on a binge eating trip around northern Italy and France. When he did come back to the United States, his weight had increased from 145 to 215 pounds (66 to 97 kg). The scenes with the heftier Jake LaMotta—which include announcing his retirement from boxing and LaMotta ending up in a Florida cell—were completed while approaching Christmas 1979 within seven to eight weeks so as not to aggravate the health issues which were already affecting De Niro's posture, breathing, and talking.

According to Evje, Jake's nightclub sequence was filmed in a closed-down San Pedro club on December 3. The jail cell head-banging scene was shot on a constructed set with De Niro asking for minimal crew to be present—there was not even a boom operator.

The final sequence where Jake LaMotta is in front of his mirror was filmed on the last day of shooting, requiring 19 takes, with only the 13th being used for the film. Scorsese wanted to have an atmosphere that would be so cold that the words would have an impact as he tries to come to terms with his relationship with his brother.

Post-production 
The editing of Raging Bull began when production was temporarily put on hold and was completed in 1980. Scorsese worked with the editor, Thelma Schoonmaker, to achieve a final cut of the film. Their main decision was to abandon Schrader's idea of LaMotta's nightclub act interweaving with the flashback of his youth and instead they just followed along the lines of a single flashback where only scenes of LaMotta practicing his stand-up would be left bookending the film. A sound mix arranged by Frank Warner was a delicate process taking six months. According to Scorsese, the sound on Raging Bull was difficult because each punch, camera shot, and flash bulb would be different. Also, there was the issue of trying to balance the quality between scenes featuring dialogue and those involving boxing (which were done in Dolby Stereo). Raging Bull went through a test screening in front of a small audience including the chief executives of United Artists, Steven Bach and Andy Albeck. The screening was shown at the MGM screening room in New York around July 1980. Later, Albeck praised Scorsese by calling him a "true artist".

According to the producers Robert Chartoff and Irwin Winkler, matters were made worse when United Artists decided not to distribute the film but no other studios were interested when they attempted to sell the rights. Scorsese made no secret that Raging Bull would be his "Hollywood swan song" and he took unusual care of its rights during post-production. Scorsese threatened to remove his credit from the film if he was not allowed to sort a reel which obscured the name of a whisky brand known as "Cutty Sark" which was heard in a scene. The work was completed only four days shy of the premiere.

In 2012, Raging Bull was voted by the Motion Picture Editors Guild as the best-edited film in history.

Copyright litigation 
Paula Petrella, heir to Frank Petrello whose works were allegedly sources for the film, filed for copyright infringement in 2009 based on MGM's 1991 copyright renewal of the film. In 2014, the Supreme Court held, in Petrella v. Metro-Goldwyn-Mayer, Inc., that Petrella's suit survived MGM's defense of "laches", the legal doctrine that protects defendants from unreasonable delays by potential plaintiffs. The case was remanded to lower courts, meaning that Petrella could receive a decision on the merits of her claim. MGM settled with Petrella in 2015.

Reception

Box office 
The brew of violence and anger, combined with the lack of a proper advertising campaign, led to the film's lukewarm box office intake of only $23 million, when compared to its $18 million budget. By the time it left theaters, it only earned $10.1 million in theatrical rentals (equivalent to $ million in ). Scorsese became concerned for his future career and worried that producers and studios might refuse to finance his films. According to Box Office Mojo, the film grossed $23,383,987 in domestic theaters (equivalent to $ in ).

Critical response 
When it first premiered in New York on November 14, 1980, the initial release of Raging Bull was met with polarized reviews, but the film would later be met with widespread critical acclaim and is widely regarded as one of Scorsese's best works. On the  review aggregator Rotten Tomatoes, the film has an approval rating of 93% based on 85 reviews, with an average rating of 8.90/10. The site's critical consensus reads, "Arguably Martin Scorsese's and Robert De Niro's finest film, Raging Bull is often painful to watch, but it's a searing, powerful work about an unsympathetic hero." Metacritic rates the movie 89 out of 100 based on 27 reviews which represents "universal acclaim". Jack Kroll of Newsweek called Raging Bull the "best movie of the year". Vincent Canby of The New York Times said that Scorsese "has made his most ambitious film as well as his finest" and went on to praise Moriarty's debut performance saying: "either she is one of the film finds of the decade or Mr. Scorsese is Svengali. Perhaps both." Time praised De Niro's performance since "much of Raging Bull exists because of the possibilities it offers De Niro to display his own explosive art". Steven Jenkins from the British Film Institute's (BFI) magazine, Monthly Film Journal, said "Raging Bull may prove to be Scorsese's finest achievement to date".

Accolades 

The Oscars were held the day after President Ronald Reagan was shot by John Hinckley, who did it as an attempt to impress Jodie Foster, who played a child prostitute in another of Scorsese's famous films, Taxi Driver (which also starred De Niro). Out of fear of being attacked, Scorsese went to the ceremony with FBI bodyguards disguised as guests who escorted him out before the announcement of the Academy Award for Best Picture was made (the winner being Robert Redford's Ordinary People).

The Los Angeles Film Critics Association voted Raging Bull the best film of 1980 and De Niro best actor. The National Board of Review also voted De Niro best actor and Pesci best supporting actor. The Berlin International Film Festival chose Raging Bull to open the festival in 1981.

The 2012 Parajanov-Vartanov Institute Award honored screenwriter Mardik Martin "for the mastery of his pen on iconic American films" Mean Streets and Raging Bull.

Legacy 
By the end of the 1980s, Raging Bull had cemented its reputation as a modern classic. It was voted the best film of the 1980s in numerous critics' polls and is regularly pointed to as both Scorsese's best film and one of the finest American films ever made. Several prominent critics, among them Roger Ebert, declared the film to be an instant classic and the consummation of Scorsese's earlier promise. Ebert proclaimed it the best film of the 1980s, and one of the ten greatest films of all time. The film has been deemed "culturally, historically, and aesthetically significant" by the United States Library of Congress and was selected for preservation in the National Film Registry in 1990.

Raging Bull was listed by Time magazine as one of the All-TIME 100 Movies. Variety magazine ranked the film number 39 on their list of the 50 greatest movies. Raging Bull was fifth on Entertainment Weekly's list of the 100 Greatest Movies of All Time. The film tied with The Bicycle Thieves and Vertigo at number 6 on Sight & Sound 2002 poll of the greatest movies ever. When Sight & Sound directors' and critics' lists from that year are combined, Raging Bull gets the most votes of any movie that has been produced since 1975. In 2002, Film4 held a poll of the 100 Greatest Movies, on which Raging Bull was voted in at number 20. Halliwell's Film Guide, a British film guide, placed Raging Bull seventh in a poll naming their selection for the "Top 1,000 Movies". TV Guide also included the film on their list of the 50 best movies. Movieline magazine included the film on its list of the 100 best movies. Leonard Maltin included Raging Bull on his 100 Must-See Films of the 20th Century list. Video Detective also included the film on its list of the top 100 movies of all time. Roger Ebert named "Robert De Niro's transformation from sleek boxer to paunchy nightclub owner in Raging Bull" as one of the 100 Greatest Movie Moments. The National Society of Film Critics ranked it #75 on their 100 Essential Films list. Rolling Stone magazine ranked it #6 on their list of the 100 Maverick Movies in the Last 100 Years.

A 1997 readers poll conducted by the L.A. Daily News ranked the film #64 on a list of the greatest American movies. The Writers Guild of America named the film as the 76th best screenplay of all time. Raging Bull is #7 on Time Out Film Guide's "Centenary Top 100" list, and it also tied at #16 (with Lawrence of Arabia) on their 1998 readers poll. In 2008, Empire magazine held a poll of The 500 Greatest Movies of All Time, taking votes from 10,000 readers, 150 film makers, and 50 film critics in which Raging Bull was placed at number 11. It was also placed on a similar list of 1000 movies by The New York Times. In 2010, Total Film selected the film as one of The 100 Greatest Movies of All Time. FilmSite.org, a subsidiary of American Movie Classics, placed Raging Bull on their list of the 100 greatest movies. Additionally, Films101.com ranked the film as the 17th best movie of all time in a list of the 10,790 most notable.

In 2012, the Motion Picture Editors Guild listed the film as the best-edited film of all time based on a survey of its membership. In the 2012 Sight & Sound polls, it was ranked the 53rd-greatest film ever made in the critics' poll and 12th in the directors' poll.   Contemporaries of Scorsese, like Francis Ford Coppola, have included it routinely in their lists for favorite films of all time. In 2015, Raging Bull ranked 29th on BBC's "100 Greatest American Films" list, voted on by film critics from around the world.

American Film Institute recognition 
 AFI's 100 Years... 100 Movies: #24 in the 1998 list and #4 in the 2007 list.
 AFI's 100 Years... 100 Thrills: #51
 AFI's 100 Years... 100 Movies (10th Anniversary Edition): #4
 AFI's 10 Top 10: #1 Sports

Soundtrack 
Martin Scorsese decided to assemble a soundtrack made of music that was popular at the time using his personal collection of 78s. With the help of Robbie Robertson, the songs were carefully chosen so they would be the ones that a person would hear on the radio, at the pool or in bars and clubs which reflected the mood of that particular era. Some lyrics from songs would also be slipped into some dialogue. The Intermezzo from Cavalleria rusticana by Italian composer Pietro Mascagni would serve as the main theme to Raging Bull after a successful try-out by Scorsese and the editor, Thelma Schoonmaker, over the film's opening titles. Two other Mascagni pieces were used in the film: the Barcarolle from Silvano, and the Intermezzo (Ratcliff's Dream) from Guglielmo Ratcliff. A two-CD soundtrack was released in 2005, long after the film was released, because of earlier difficulties obtaining rights for many of the songs, which Scorsese selected from his childhood memories growing up in New York.

Unauthorized sequel 

In 2006, Variety reported that Sunset Pictures was developing a sequel entitled Raging Bull II: Continuing the Story of Jake LaMotta, chronicling LaMotta's early life, as told in the sequel novel of the same name. Filming began on June 15, 2012 with William Forsythe as an older LaMotta and Morjean Aria as the younger version (before the events of the first film).  The film, directed by Martin Guigui also stars Joe Mantegna, Tom Sizemore, Penelope Ann Miller, Natasha Henstridge, Alicia Witt, Ray Wise, Harry Hamlin, and James Russo as Rocky Graziano. In July 2012, MGM, owners of United Artists, filed a lawsuit against LaMotta and the producers of Raging Bull II to keep the new film from being released. The former party argued that they have rights to make any authorized sequel to the original book, which goes back to an agreement LaMotta and co-author Peter Savage made with Chartoff-Winkler, producers of the original film. In addition, MGM argues that the defendants are publicly claiming the film to be a sequel to the original film, which could most likely "tarnish" its predecessor's reputation. In August 2012, the producers retitled the film The Bronx Bull, disassociating itself as a sequel to Raging Bull, and the lawsuit was subsequently dropped.

Notes

References

External links 

 
 
 
 
 Raging Bull at FilmSite.org
 
 
 
 
Raging Bull: American Minotaur an essay by Robin Robertson at The Criterion Collection
Raging Bull: Never Got Me Down an essay by Glenn Kenny at The Criterion Collection
 Raging Bull essay by Daniel Eagan in America's Film Legacy: The Authoritative Guide to the Landmark Movies in the National Film Registry, A&C Black, 2010 , pages 768–770.

1980 films
1980 drama films
1980s American films
1980s biographical drama films
1980s English-language films
1980s sports drama films
American biographical drama films
American black-and-white films
American boxing films
BAFTA winners (films)
Biographical films about sportspeople
Cultural depictions of American men
Cultural depictions of boxers
Cultural depictions of Joe Louis
Films about domestic violence
Films about Italian-American culture
Films based on memoirs
Films directed by Martin Scorsese
Films featuring a Best Actor Academy Award-winning performance
Films featuring a Best Drama Actor Golden Globe winning performance
Films partially in color
Films produced by Irwin Winkler
Films produced by Robert Chartoff
Films set in Cleveland
Films set in Miami
Films set in Michigan
Films set in New York City
Films set in the 1940s
Films set in the 1950s
Films set in the 1960s
Films set in 1941
Films set in 1943
Films set in 1944
Films set in 1945
Films set in 1946
Films set in 1947
Films set in 1949
Films set in 1950
Films set in 1951
Films set in 1956
Films set in 1957
Films set in 1958
Films set in 1964
Films about obesity
Films shot in Los Angeles
Films whose editor won the Best Film Editing Academy Award
Films with screenplays by Paul Schrader
Sports films based on actual events
United Artists films
United States National Film Registry films